Darin at the Copa is Bobby Darin's fourth album and third straight top-ten charting LP in the US. It debuted on 17 October 1960, peaked at number 9 and remained in the LP chart for 38 weeks. The album was recorded live at the Copacabana nightclub in New York.

Reception

Music critic John Bush wrote in his Allmusic review "A complete entertainer, Darin only occasionally concentrates on the business of singing, making Darin at the Copa the type of concert work that rarely succeeds as a purely aural recording. Bobby Darin is obviously performing, not just singing, and listeners are often left out during his countless jokes and vocal asides—each of which get enormous responses from the original audience. The music is solid and Darin does his finger-popping best, but he walks a thin line between swinging and an outrageous parody of same... listening decades later, it's difficult to avoid the wish he'd played this date just a bit more straight."

Track listing
Medley: "Swing Low Sweet Chariot/Lonesome Road" (arranged by Bobby Darin and Richard Wess, (Traditional/Gene Austin, Nat Shilkret) – 2:12
"Some of These Days" (Shelton Brooks) – 2:34
"Mack the Knife" (Bert Brecht, Kurt Weill, Marc Blitzstein) – 2:58
"Love for Sale" (Cole Porter) – 3:02
"Clementine" (Woody Harris) – 3:13
"You'd Be So Nice to Come Home To" (Cole Porter) – 2:09
"Dream Lover" (Bobby Darin) – 2:04
"Bill Bailey, Won't You Please Come Home" (arranged by Bobby Darin and Bobby Scott) (Hughie Cannon) – 2:02
"I Have Dreamed" (Richard Rodgers, Oscar Hammerstein II) - (Richard Rodgers, Oscar Hammerstein II) – 2:06
"I Can't Give You Anything But Love" (Dorothy Fields, Jimmy McHugh) – 2:14
"Alright, O.K., You Win" (Mayme Watts, Sid Wyche) – 4:49
Medley: "By Myself/When Your Lover Has Gone" (Arthur Schwartz, Howard Dietz/Einar Aaron Swan) – 3:29
"I Got a Woman" (Ray Charles) – 3:53
"That's All" (Alan Brandt, Bob Haymes) – 2:06

Personnel
Bobby Darin – vocals, vibraphone
Paul Shelley's Copacabana Orchestra - orchestra 
Richard Behrke – conductor, piano
Ronnie Zito – drums
Technical
Phil Ieble, Tom Dowd – engineers
Supervised by Ahmet Ertegün and Nesuhi Ertegün

References

1960 live albums
Bobby Darin albums
Atco Records live albums
Albums produced by Ahmet Ertegun
Albums produced by Nesuhi Ertegun